Ruvimbo Samanga is a Zimbabwean scholar and lawyer working with the Space Law & Policy. Samanga was the National Point of Contact in Zimbabwe under the Space Generation Advisory Council, which works in collaboration with the United Nations' Programme on Space Applications. She has held Research positions at the Open Lunar Foundation and served as a Ban Ki Moon Global Scholar.

Early life and education 
Ruvimbo was born on 6 November 1995 in Bulawayo Zimbabwe where she attained her primary education and completed her secondary education at the Dominican Convent High School. She currently holds a BA Law (cum laude), an LLB and an LLM in International Trade and Investment Law from the University of Pretoria.

Career 
From 2018, she was appointed as a committee member of the Space Generation Advisory Council under the United Nations Program on Space Applications. She contribute to 2 working groups and that was Space Law and Policy tasked thee of  joint African Space Agency as well as the Small Satellites Project Group. Her paper presentations on Space Law & Policy were accepted and presented at the United Nations Office for Outer Space Affairs, the International Astronautical Congress as well as the African Leadership Congress on Space & Technology. Her papers also specifically focused on the developmental potential of space technology for African states, were published with the Springer Collection on Southern Space Studies.

Her interest in Space Law began when she participated in the Manfred Lachs International Space Law Moot Court Competition. In 2018, Ruvimbo led the team that won the International Championship of the Manfred Lachs Space Moot, recording Africa's first win in the history of the Moot, a feat unequalled in the African Continent thus far.

Awards 
 Top Talents under 25 on the globe.

References

External links 
 https://ruvimbosamanga.com/

Zimbabwean women lawyers
Living people
1995 births
21st-century Zimbabwean lawyers
Space law